Spofforth with Stockeld is a civil parish in the Harrogate district of North Yorkshire, England.

According to the 2001 UK census, Spofforth with Stockeld parish had a population of 1,121, increasing to 1,169 at the 2011 census.

The parish includes the ruins of Spofforth Castle and the  Stockeld Park estate.

Governance
Spofforth with Stockeld parish is in the Harrogate Borough electoral ward of Spofforth with Lower Wharfedale. This ward stretches south-west to Huby and has a total population of 3,100 at the 2011 Census.

The parish falls under the House of Commons constituency of Selby and Ainsty, whose MP is Nigel Adams of the Conservative Party.

See also
Spofforth, North Yorkshire

References

External links 
 www.spofforthvillage.org the village website

Civil parishes in North Yorkshire